James J. "Gentleman Jim" Yeager (February 2, 1909 – May 17, 1971) was an American football player and coach. He served as the head football coach at Fort Hays State University (1935), Iowa State University (1937–1940), and the University of Colorado at Boulder (1941–1943, 1946–1947), compiling a career college football record of 48–38–3. Yeager won conference championships in 1935 with Fort Hays State and in 1942 and 1943 with Colorado.

Playing career
Yeager played football as a defensive lineman and guard at Kansas State University from 1928 to 1930 and graduated from the university in 1931.

Coaching career

Fort Hays State
Yeager got his start in coaching as the ninth head football coach for the Fort Hays Tigers located in Hays, Kansas and he held that position for the 1935 season. His record at Fort Hays was 8–2. This ranks him 15th at Fort Hays in total wins and first at Fort Hays in winning percentage. That year, his team was declared the Central Intercollegiate Athletic Conference co-champions.

Iowa State
After his success at Fort Hays, Yeager was named the 16th head coach for the Iowa State University Cyclones located in Ames, Iowa and he held that position for four seasons, from 1937 until 1940. His coaching record at Iowa state was 16–19–1. This ranks him 15th at Iowa state in total wins and 14th at Iowa state in winning percentage His best season came in 1938, when the team produced a record of 7–1–1.

Colorado
Yeager then returned to success as head coach of the Colorado Buffaloes where he coached five season between 1941 and 1947 with a two-year hiatus in 1944 and 1945. His record there stands at 24–17–2.

Death
Yeager died of an apparent heart attack on May 17, 1971 at the age of 62.

Head coaching record

References

External links
 

1909 births
1971 deaths
American football guards
Colorado Buffaloes football coaches
Fort Hays State Tigers football coaches
Iowa State Cyclones football coaches
Kansas State Wildcats football players
People from Chase County, Kansas
Coaches of American football from Kansas